Bromford Bridge may refer to:

 The Bromford Viaduct, a viaduct in the Bromford area of Birmingham, England, which carries the M6 motorway
 Bromford Bridge railway station, defunct railway station in Birmingham
 Bromford Bridge Racecourse, former racecourse in Birmingham